George Hinsley (19 July 1914 – 1989) was an English footballer who played for Barnsley, Bradford City, Halifax Town and Nelson.

References

1914 births
1989 deaths
Footballers from Sheffield
English footballers
Barnsley F.C. players
Bradford City A.F.C. players
Halifax Town A.F.C. players
Nelson F.C. players
English Football League players
Association football defenders